Tomáš Polách (born 16 January 1977 in Slavičín) is a Czech football midfielder. He retired from professional football in 2014 and currently manages Zbrojovka Brno U19. He played for most of his career in Slovácko and Zbrojovka Brno.

References

External links
 
 Guardian Football

1977 births
Living people
People from Slavičín
Czech footballers
Czech expatriate footballers
Czech First League players
Association football midfielders
FC Zbrojovka Brno players
1. FC Slovácko players
FC Fastav Zlín players
FK Dubnica players
FK Hodonín players
SFC Opava players
Slovak Super Liga players
Expatriate footballers in Slovakia
Czech expatriate sportspeople in Slovakia
Expatriate footballers in Austria
Czech expatriate sportspeople in Austria
Sportspeople from the Zlín Region